A105 may refer to:

Roads 
 A105 road (England), a road in London connecting Canonbury and Enfield
 A105 motorway (France), a road near Combs-la-Ville
 A105 is the route number of the Rublevo-Uspenskoe Shosse west of Moscow

Other uses
 AS-105, a 1965 spaceflight in the Apollo program
 Austin A105, a 1956 British car, in Austin's Westminster series
 RFA Easedale (A105), a 1941 Royal Fleet Auxiliary fleet tanker ship
 ASTM A105, a grade of carbon steel